Patrick Maher may refer to:

 Pádraic Maher (born 1989), Irish hurler
 Pat Maher "Fox" (1872–1933), Irish hurler
 Patrick Maher (hurler) (born 1989), Irish hurler
 Patrick Maher (Irish republican) (1889–1921), Irish Republican Army volunteer executed in Mountjoy Prison as one of the Forgotten Ten

See also
Patrick Meagher (disambiguation)